Tužina is a village and municipality in Prievidza District in the Trenčín Region of western Slovakia.

History
In historical records the village was first mentioned in 1393.

Geography
The municipality lies at an altitude of 360 metres and covers an area of 48.193 km². It has a population of about 1219 people.

External links
 
 
http://www.statistics.sk/mosmis/eng/run.html

Villages and municipalities in Prievidza District